Catherine Kobelka (born 24 November 1982) is a  Guyanese retired footballer who played as a goalkeeper and midfielder. She has been a member of the Guyana women's national team.

College career
Kobelka attended the Gardner–Webb University in Boiling Springs, North Carolina, United States.

International career
Kobelka capped for Guyana at senior level during the 2010 CONCACAF Women's World Cup Qualifying qualification.

See also
List of Guyana women's international footballers

References

1982 births
Living people
Guyanese women's footballers
Guyana women's international footballers
Women's association football goalkeepers
Women's association football midfielders
College women's soccer players in the United States
Gardner–Webb Runnin' Bulldogs women's soccer players